Georgia-Rose Brown (born 22 January 1995 in Auchenflower, Queensland) is an Australian artistic gymnast. She has competed in four World Championships and helped the Australian women secure a silver medal at the 2014 Commonwealth Games in Glasgow, Scotland.

Career
Brown was part of the Australian women's team at the 2011 World Artistic Gymnastics Championships in Tokyo. She helped the team qualify for the 2012 Summer Olympics in 6th place and competed on the uneven bars in the team final, where Australia finished 8th. The following year, she was chosen as an alternate for the Australian women's Olympic team.

In 2014, she was part of the team that won silver at the 2014 Commonwealth Games in Glasgow. She qualified for the uneven bars and vault finals, where she came in 5th and 7th, respectively. She finished in 13th place in the all-around. Later that year, she competed at her second World Championships in Nanning, China. She contributed scores on all four events to help Australia secure the 8th spot in the team final, and qualified to the individual all-around final with a score of 54.698.

Senior competitive history

References

External links
 
 Georgia-Rose Brown at Gymnastics Australia

1995 births
Living people
Australian female artistic gymnasts
Gymnasts at the 2014 Commonwealth Games
Gymnasts at the 2018 Commonwealth Games
Commonwealth Games medallists in gymnastics
Commonwealth Games silver medallists for Australia
Commonwealth Games bronze medallists for Australia
Sportswomen from Queensland
21st-century Australian women
Medallists at the 2018 Commonwealth Games